This list shows the French exonyms for German toponyms.

A
Aachen Aix-la-Chapelle
Aargau Argovie
Aschaffenburg Aschaffenbourg
Augsburg Augsbourg

B
Bad Iburg Ibourg
Bad Kreuznach Creusenac (old)
Baden-Baden Bade les Bains, Bade-en-Bade (old)
Bautzen Budisse (old)
Bayreuth Baireut
Berlin Berlin (different pronunciation, same spelling)
Bernkastel-Kues Berncastel-Cues
Bernburg Bernbourg
Blieskastel Bliescastel
Brandenburg an der Havel Brandebourg
Braunschweig Brunswick
Breisach Brisach
Bremen Brême

C

Chemnitz Chemnice (old)
Cloppenburg Cloppenbourg
Coburg Cobourg

D
Dasburg Dasbourg
Donauwörth Donawert (old)
Dortmund Trémoigne (very old)
Dresden Dresde
Duisburg Duisbourg
Düsseldorf Dusseldorf

E
Eisenach Isenac (old)
Erfurt Erfort (old)
Erlangen Erlangue (old)

F
Flensburg Flensbourg
Frankenberg Frammont (old)
Frankfurt am Main Francfort-sur-le-Main
Frankfurt (Oder) Francfort-sur-l'Oder
Freiburg im Breisgau Fribourg-en-Brisgau
Fulda Foulde (old)
Fürstenberg/Havel Furstemberg

G
Göttingen Goettingue (old)
Greifswald Gripswalde (old)
Großrosseln Grande Rosselle

H
Hamburg Hambourg
Hameln Hamelin
Hannover Hanovre
Homburg (Saar) Hombourg
Herzogenrath Rolduc
Hildburghausen Hildbourghausen

J
Jena Iéna
Jülich Juliers

K
Kaiserslautern Caseloutre (old)
Kalkar Calcar
Kaldern Caldern
Kandel Candel
Karlsruhe Carlsruhe (old)
Kleinblittersdorf Kleinbliederstroff
Kleve Clèves
Koblenz Coblence
Köln Cologne
Konstanz Constance
Krefeld Crevelt

L
Lauenburg an der Elbe Lauenbourg
Limburg an der Lahn Limbourg
Leiningen Linange
Leipzig Leipsick (old)
Lübeck Lubeck
Lüneburg Lunebourg

M
Magdeburg Magdebourg
Mainz Mayence
Mannheim Manheim
Meißen Misnie (old)
Memmingen Memmingue (old)
Merseburg Mersebourg
Merzig Mercy (Sarre)
Monschau Montjoie
München Munich
Münster Munster

N
Naumburg (Hessen) Naumbourg
Naumburg (Saale) Naumbourg
Neubrandenburg Neubrandenbourg
Neuenburg am Rhein Neuenbourg
Neu-Isenburg Neuf-Isenbourg
Niederkrüchten Nedercruechten
Nürnberg Nuremberg

O
Offenburg Offenbourg
Oldenburg Oldenbourg
Osnabrück Osnabruck

P
Philippsburg Philippsbourg
Pirna Pirne

Q
Quakenbrück Quackenbruck

R
Radeburg Radebourg
Ravensburg Ravensbourg
Regensburg Ratisbonne
Rheinfelden Rhinfeld

S
Saarbrücken Sarrebruck
Saarlouis Sarrelouis
Saarwellingen Sarrevailingue
Siegburg Siegbourg 
Solingen Solingue
Speyer Spire
Stuttgart Stutgard (old)

T
Tecklenburg Tecklembourg
Trier Trèves
Tübingen Tubingue (old)

W

Wiesbaden Wisbaden
Wittenberg Wittemberg
Würzburg Wurtzbourg

Z
Zweibrücken Deux-Ponts

Regions
Baden Bade
Bayern Bavière
Brandenburg Brandebourg
Franken Franconie
Hessen Hesse
Lausitz Lusace
Mecklenburg Meklembourg
Niedersachsen Basse-Saxe
Oberpfalz Haut-Palatinat
Pfalz Palatinat
Pommern Poméranie
Preußen Prusse
Rheinland Rhénanie
Saarland Sarre
Sachsen Saxe
Schlesien Silésie
Schwaben Souabe
Schwarzwald Forêt Noire
Thüringen Thuringe
Westfalen Westphalie
Württemberg Wurtemberg

Former German cities and villages
Austerlitz Austerlitz
Danzig Dantzig / Dantzick
Karlsbad Carlsbad
Königsberg Kœnigsberg
Prag Prague
Pressburg Presbourg

See also
 French exonyms
 List of French exonyms for Italian toponyms
 List of French exonyms for Dutch toponyms
 List of French exonyms for English toponyms
 List of English exonyms for German toponyms

French exonyms for German toponyms
French exonyms
French
Geography of Switzerland
French exonyms
French